The Eparchy of Košice is a Slovak Greek Catholic Church ecclesiastical territory or eparchy of the Catholic Church covering the territory of the Košice Region in Slovakia. It is suffragan eparchy in the ecclesiastical province of the metropolitan Archeparchy of Prešov. It was established on 30 January 2008 by Pope Benedict XVI from the territory of the apostolic exarchate created previously (on 21 February 1997) by his predecessor John Paul II.

History 
 Established on 27 January 1997 as Apostolic Exarchate of Košice, on territory split off from the Slovak Catholic Eparchy of Prešov.
 Elevated on 30 January 2008 to Slovak Catholic Eparchy of Košice.

List of eparchs
 Milan Chautur (27 January 1997 – 24 June 2021)
named eparch 30 January 2008
 Cyril Vasiľ (24 June 2021 – present)
 apostolic administrator sede plena (20 January 2020 – 24 June 2021)

References

External links
 Official website (in Slovak)

Catholic Church in Slovakia
Catholic dioceses in Slovakia
Eastern Catholic dioceses
Košice